Jelendol ( or ) is a small settlement in the hills north of Škocjan in the Municipality of Škocjan in southeastern Slovenia. Within the municipality, it belongs to the Village Community of Dole. The area is part of the historical region of Lower Carniola. The municipality is now included in the Southeast Slovenia Statistical Region.

Notable people
Notable people that were born or lived in Jelendol include:
Stanislav Hočevar (born 1945), Archbishop of Belgrade

References

External links
Jelendol, Škocjan at Geopedia

Populated places in the Municipality of Škocjan